Sangama is a 2008 Kannada language film starring Ganesh and Vedhika in lead roles. It is directed by Ravi Varma and produced by S.V. Babu.The film released  on 24 October 2008.

Plot
Gajaraj has a big dream of getting his daughter Lakshmi (Vedhika) married to a good guy and he's looking out for a good bridegroom. Balu (Ganesh), who is Gajaraj's neighbour, has hard work getting the information of family background of the proposals and till now he has gotten it for Gajaraj's daughter. One day Balu gets a marriage proposal from someone who is an NRI guy from Germany. Lakshmi's family members are happy with the proposal and have agreed to it. Lakshmi's marriage arrangements are becoming greater and greater. Lakshmi expresses her love for Balu but he denies them. When it becomes very difficult for Lakshmi to forget Balu and marry the German bridegroom her family members come to know about her feelings towards Balu. Later her family members accept her affection for Balu and decide that she can marry Balu.

Cast
Ganesh as Balu
Vedhika as Lakshmi
Rangayana Raghu
Sadhu Kokila
Komal Kumar
Tulasi Shivamani
Jayamma
Myna Chandru
Mohan Juneja
Yeshas
Meghana

Box office
The movie opened very strongly in B.O. The movies which were dated to be released the following week were postponed for 30 days. The movie completed 50 days successfully in 10 theatres in spite of negative reviews from critics which praised Ganesh and Vedhika's performance and criticised the irrelevant ending of the movie.

Music
The official soundtrack contains six songs composed by Devi Sri Prasad with lyrics penned by Kaviraj. The audio of the film released on 28 September 2008.

Home media
The movie was released on DVD with 5.1 channel surround sound and English subtitles and VCD.

References

External links
 
Official site

2000s Kannada-language films
2008 films